The mayor of New Britain, Connecticut, is the city's chief executive.

List of city's chief executives

Notes

 
New Britain